Common names: Dinnik's viper, Caucasus subalpine viper.

Vipera dinniki is a viper species native to the Caucasus Mountains region, part of Russia, Georgia, and Azerbaijan. Like all other vipers, it is venomous. No subspecies are currently recognized.

Etymology
The specific name, dinniki, is in honor of Russian herpetologist Nikolai Yakovlevich Dinnik.

Description
Of the 49 Russian specimens of V. dinniki examined by Orlov and Tuniyev (1990), 29 were males, and the largest male measured  in total length (including tail).

Geographic range
Vipera dinniki is found from Russia (Great Caucasus) and Georgia (high mountain basin of the Inguri River), eastward to Azerbaijan.

According to Nikolsky (1916), the type locality is "upper reaches of the Malaya Laba 8000 feet [2438 m] above sea level ... and Svanetia, 7000 feet [2134 m] above sea level." According to Nilson et al. (1995), Vedmederja et al. (1986) restricted the type locality to "Malaya Laba" through lectotype selection. Orlov and Tuniyev (1990) give the lectotype locality as "Upper reaches of the Mala (Small) Laba River, Northern Caucasus".

Habitat

Reproduction
V. dinniki is viviparous. Mating occurs in April and May, and young are born in August and September. Litter size is 3–7 newborns.

Conservation status
This species, V. dinikki, is classified as vulnerable according to the IUCN with the following criteria: B1ab(iii,v) (v3.1, 2009). This indicates, that the population occupies a severely fragmented area over a range of less than 20,000 km2 (7,772 mi 2). A continued decline in habitat size or quality and in population is expected.

References

Further reading

Nilson G, Tuniyev BS, Orlov NL, Höggren M, Andrén C (1995). "Systematics of the vipers of the Caucasus: Polymorphism or sibling species?" Asiatic Herpetological Research 6: 1-26.
Nikolsky AM (1913). Reptiles and Amphibians of the Caucasus (Herpetologia caucasia). Tiflis: The Caucasus Museum Publishing. 272 pp. (Vipera berus dinniki, new subspecies). (in Russian).
Orlov NL, Tuniyev BS (1990). "Three species in the Vipera kaznakowi complex (Eurosiberian Group) in the Caucasus: Their present distribution, possible genesis, and phylogeny". Asiatic Herpetological Research 3: 1-36.

External links
 

dinniki
Reptiles of Western Asia
Reptiles described in 1913
Taxa named by Alexander Nikolsky
Reptiles of Russia